Hussey Hill is a ridge located in the Catskill Mountains of New York south of Kingston. Fly Mountain is located west, Prospect Hill, and Shaupeneak Mountain is located south of Hussey Hill.

References

Mountains of Ulster County, New York
Mountains of New York (state)